The 1985–86 Pittsburgh Panthers men's basketball team represented the University of Pittsburgh in the 1985–86 NCAA Division I men's basketball season. Led by head coach Roy Chipman, the Panthers finished with a record of 15–14. They were invited to the 1986 National Invitation Tournament where they lost in the first round to SW Missouri State.

References

Pittsburgh Panthers men's basketball seasons
Pittsburgh
Pittsburgh Pan
Pittsburgh Pan